Mathieu Billot (born 22 December 1985) is a French equestrian. He competed in the individual jumping event at the 2020 Summer Olympics.

References

External links
 

1985 births
Living people
French male equestrians
Olympic equestrians of France
Equestrians at the 2020 Summer Olympics
People from Deauville
French show jumping riders